Adoration of the Shepherds or Nativity is a 1612-1614 oil on canvas painting by Fabrizio Santafede during his mature period for Maria Orsini's chapel in the Gesù e Maria church in Naples. It is now in the National Museum of Capodimonte.

Sources
Image

1614 paintings
Paintings in the collection of the Museo di Capodimonte
Santafede